Hatesphere is a Danish thrash metal band from Aarhus, formed in 2000 by guitarist Peter "Pepe" Hansen. As of 2016, the band consists of vocalist Esben "Esse" Elnegaard Kjaer Hansen, guitarists Peter "Pepe" Lyse Hansen, and Kasper Kirkegaard, bass player Jimmy Nedergaard and drummer Mike Park Nielsen. The band has released ten albums and two EPs to date.

History 
HateShpere was formed in Aarhus, Denmark, by guitarist Peter "Pepe" Hansen in 2000. HateSphere's first three albums, Hatesphere, Bloodred Hatred and Ballet of the Brute, gained them acclaim among heavy metal fans across Europe. Under the leadership of Scarlet Records, HateSphere toured Europe with The Haunted in 2003 and again with Exodus in 2004, while also appearing at Wacken Open Air, With Full Force, and Hellfest Festivals.

In 2005, HateSphere signed a deal with SPV and assembled a production team of established Danish producers; including Tommy Hansen, Jacob Hansen, and Tue Madsen. The Sickness Within was released in September of that same year receiving rave reviews from the worldwide metal media. The album garnered HateSphere multiple tours of Europe with Kreator, Morbid Angel, Soilwork, Dark Tranquillity, and Chimaira. In addition to headlining shows in support of The Sickness Within, the band made appearances at Wacken Open Air, Metal Camp, and Roskilde Festival.

HateSphere continued to raise its profile on an international level by touring Japan, co-headlining the UK with Gojira, and headlining the first edition of The Danish Dynamite tour with Raunchy and Volbeat. HateSphere made history by being the first Danish band to tour China. Following the 2007 release of Serpent Smiles and Killer Eyes, HateSphere again hit the road headlining Europe with Aborted and Dagoba, which was followed by successful performances at Wacken Open Air and Roskilde Festivals and a support tour of Poland with Behemoth in September.

Serpent Smiles and Killer Eyes also reached position 26 on the Danish National Music Charts. Soon thereafter, HateSphere amicably parted ways with then vocalist Jacob Bredahl, who chose to concentrate on other musical endeavors. HateSphere soon assembled a new lineup, featuring frontman Joller Albrechtsen at the 2007 Danish Metal Awards (DMeA). This lineup embarked on a month-long co-headlining tour of Europe with Swedish death metal pioneers Dismember.

HateSphere entered Antfarm Studios in November 2008 to record the next album entitled To the Nines. To the Nines was recorded, mixed and mastered in less than a month under the leadership of longtime friend and producer Tue Madsen (Earth Crisis, The Haunted, Heaven Shall Burn) at AntFarm Studios in Aarhus and was released by Napalm Records.

In February 2010 vocalist Jonathan "Joller" Albrechtsen left Hatesphere, and the band announced that Mevadio singer Morten "Kruge" Madsen would replace Albrechtsen on the February–March North American tour with The Black Dahlia Murder, Obscura, and Augury.

In July 2010, the band announced that a permanent replacement for Jonathan "Joller" Albrechtsen had been found in Esben "Esse" Hansen, also known from Danish metal band As We Fight. At the same point it became known that bass player Mixen Lindberg had left the band and that he would be temporarily replaced by the band's former bass player and founding member Mikael Ehlert until the end of 2010. The band toured the US and Canada September–November 2010 supporting Nevermore and Parasite Inc. In May 2011, the band announced that Gob Squad bass player Jimmy Nedergaard had joined the band.

Members

Current members 
Mathias Uldall – Vocals - (2022 - present) 
Peter "Pepe" Lyse Hansen – lead guitar (2000–present)
Kasper Kirkegaard – rhythm guitar (2016–present)
Mike Park Nielsen – drums (2009–present)
Jimmy Nedergaard – bass (2011–present)

Touring members 
Niels Peter "Ziggy" Siegfredsen (2000–2002)
Morten "Kruge" Madsen – vocals (2010)
Morten Løwe Sørensen – drums (2005)
Henrik "Heinz" Bastrup Jacobsen – guitar (2008)
Mikael Ehlert Hansen – bass (2010)
 Nikolaj Harlis Poulsen – bass (2013)

Former members 
Vocals
Esben "Esse" Hansen – vocals (2010–2021)
Jacob "Dr. J" Bredahl (2000–2007)
Jonathan "Joller" Albrechtsen (2007–2010)

Rhythm guitar
Niels Peter "Ziggy" Siegfredsen (2000–2002)
Henrik "Heinz" Bastrup Jacobsen (2002–2007)
Jakob Nyholm (2007–2015)

Bass
Mikael Ehlert Hansen (2000–2007)
Mixen Lindberg (2007–2010)

Drums
Morten Toft Hansen (2000–2003)
Anders "Andy Gold" Gyldenøhr (2003–2007)
Dennis Buhl (2007–2009)

Timeline

Discography

Studio albums 
Hatesphere (2001)
Bloodred Hatred (2002)
Ballet of the Brute (2004)
The Sickness Within (2005)
Serpent Smiles and Killer Eyes (2007)
To the Nines (2009)
The Great Bludgeoning (2011)
Murderlust (2013)
New Hell (2015)
Reduced to Flesh (2018)
Hatred Reborn (2023)

EPs 
Something Old, Something New, Something Borrowed and Something Black (EP, 2003)
The Killing (EP, 2005)

Split 
Versus (2013)

Videography 
Sickness Within
Reaper of Life
Forever War
Drinking with the King of the Dead
Floating
To the Nines
Resurrect with a Vengeance
Smell of Death
Pandora's Hell
Lines Crossed Lives Lost
Ruled by Domination

References

External links 

Danish heavy metal musical groups
Danish death metal musical groups
Danish melodic death metal musical groups
Danish thrash metal musical groups
Musical groups established in 2000
Century Media Records artists
Musical quintets
Scarlet Records artists
Napalm Records artists